The Great Britain men's national squash team represents Great Britain in international squash team competitions between 1967 and 1979.

Since 1967, Great Britain has won 2 World Squash Team Open titles.

Results

World Team Squash Championships

See also 
 World Team Squash Championships

References 

Squash teams
Men's national squash teams
Squash